Improvisation No. 30 (Cannons) is an oil painting executed between 1911 and 1913 by the abstract painter Vasily Kandinsky. The work was donated by the Chicago lawyer Arthur Jerome Eddy to the Art Institute of Chicago, in whose permanent collection it still remains.

Interpretation
Painted in Germany in the years immediately preceding World War I the canvas represents a world on the brink of conflict and disaster. The cannons of the title can be readily discerned, as well as buildings and a small group of people (at left).

See also
List of paintings by Wassily Kandinsky

References

External links 

1913 paintings
Paintings by Wassily Kandinsky
Paintings in the collection of the Art Institute of Chicago